is a small (~2 meter) near-Earth object that passed about  from the surface of Earth while passing over Antarctica on 25 October 2021 around 03:07 UT. Given the small size of the asteroid it only reached the brightness of Pluto at around apparent magnitude 14. Since it approached from the direction of the Sun, it was not discovered until 4 hours after closest approach.

The 2021 Earth approach lifted the orbit and increased the orbital period from 356 days to 413 days. This changed it from an Aten asteroid to an Apollo asteroid.

Notes

References

External links 
 2021 UA1 Close approach date: 2021 10 25.130000 (03 07 12.0) – MPC diagram using WebGL
 2021 UA1 – Tony Dunn (Gravity Simulator)
 2021 UA1 – David Rankin (Catalina Sky Survey)
 
 
 

Minor planet object articles (unnumbered)
Potential impact events caused by near-Earth objects
20211025
20211025